The Asclepiad was a quarterly medical journal published and edited by the British physician and medical historian Benjamin Ward Richardson in 1861 and from 1884 to 1895.

Early publication (First series, 1861) 
The Asclepiad was originally published by Richardson in 1861 with the subtitle of Clinical Essays. This was originally intended as a periodical. However, Richardson's other activities led to his requiring to stop the project.

Later publication (Second series, 1884-1895) 
Richardson re-founded The Asclepiad with the new subtitle of A Book of Original Research and Observation in the Science, Art, and Literature of Medicine, Preventive and Curative. This run continued for 11 volumes from 1884 to 1895. The eleventh volume was delayed in publication which Richardson explained was due to "unusual labour in hospital practice, together with original researches on nervous matter, which would not admit of hasty observation". Richardson remained the editor of The Asclepiad until his death when the journal ceased publication.

References 

General medical journals
Publications established in 1861
Quarterly journals
Publications disestablished in 1895
English-language journals
Publications disestablished in 1861
Publications established in 1884
1861 establishments in the United Kingdom